At least two ships of the French Navy have been named Dantzig:

  a 16-gun vessel in service 1641–1649
  a 74-gun  launched in 1807 ans struck in 1816

French Navy ship names